"No Limit" is a song recorded by Belgian/Dutch Eurodance group 2 Unlimited in 1993. It was their fifth single in total and the first to be released from their second album, No Limits! (1993). The song is one of their most commercially successful singles, especially in Europe, reaching the number-one spot in 35 countries and the top 10 in several others. Like previous releases, the UK version of the single removed all of the raps from Ray Slijngaard, leaving just Anita Dels' vocals. One word from the rap was kept, the word 'Techno' (from the line "I'm making techno and I am proud") which was looped and repeated during the middle of the song, turning the line into "Techno! Techno! Techno! Techno!" and giving the song an extra vocal hook. Its accompanying music video received heavy rotation on MTV Europe.

Chart performance
"No Limit" peaked at number one in 35 countries. In Europe, it went to number-one in Austria, Belgium, Denmark, Finland, France, Ireland, the Netherlands, Norway, Portugal, Spain, Sweden, Switzerland and the United Kingdom, as well as on the Eurochart Hot 100. In the UK, the single reached number-one in its fourth week on the chart, on 7 February 1993, and stayed at the top of the UK Singles Chart for five weeks. Additionally, it also made it to the top 10 in Germany (2), Greece (2), Iceland (4) and Italy (8). Outside Europe, "No Limit" peaked at number two on the RPM Dance/Urban chart in Canada, number seven in Australia, number 16 in Zimbabwe, number 21 on the US Billboard Hot Dance Club Play chart and number 40 in New Zealand. 

The song was awarded with a gold record in Australia, Austria, France and Germany, and a platinum record in the Netherlands and Switzerland.

Critical reception
Larry Flick from Billboard wrote, "After several weeks at the top of Britain's pop charts, European rave duo is ready tackle the U.S. radio market with a bright ditty that melds techno, hi-NRG, and rap elements. The hook is irresistible, and the pace is heart-racing. Will please fans of last year's hit, "Twilight Zone", while reeling in newcomers." Tony Parsons from The Daily Telegraph declared it as a "high-speed anthem". Per Reinholdt from Danish Gaffa called it a "dance-powerhit", noting its "inciting up-tempo" and a rhythm and theme "with the same temper as a dressed beeswarm". He also named the song a "piece of pop art". In a Guinness World Records review, the sound of "No Limit" was compared to "the sound giant dinosaurs might make stomping on cities". A reviewer from Irish Independent described it as "a humugous global hit". In his weekly UK chart commentary, James Masterton wrote, "Of all the techno-rave dance acts, 2 Unlimited are the most successful, notching up 5 hits in a row with all making the 20. "No Limit" being the latest and most frantic". Alan Jones from Music Week viewed it as "obvious pop fare". James Hamilton from the RM Dance Update declared it as "madly catchy" and a "tuneful techno pop galloper". Johnny Lee from Smash Hits called it a "stormtrooper". Australian student newspaper Woroni complimented it as "tremendously exciting and highly recommended", naming it an "obvious highlight" of the No Limits! album.

Impact and legacy
"No Limit" was ranked number 65 in BuzzFeeds list of "The 101 Greatest Dance Songs of the '90s" in 2017. Stopera and Galindo said that "this is possibly the most aggressive beat from the '90s. It's like they're strumming a GIANT rubber band." Tom Ewing of Freaky Trigger felt the track's "echoey hi-hat hits and the union of steam-hammer bass and rubber-ball synths" carry the industrial, "piston-powered aggression" of Belgian rave music. He also noted the presence of a cowbell in the back of the track. In 2015, Graham Clark from The Yorkshire Times stated that "the track at the time sounded unlike anything else but you can hear how it has influenced so many of today's electronic dance music tracks".

Track listings

CD single
"No Limit" (Radio Edit No Rap) (3:08)
"No Limit" (Radio Edit Rap) (3:30)

CD maxi
"No Limit" (Radio Edit) (3:15)
"No Limit" (Extended Mix) (5:40)
"No Limit" (Automatic Remix) (4:54)
"No Limit" (Rio and Le Jean Remix) (3:53)
"No Limit" (Automatic Breakbeat Remix) (4:45)

CD maxi
"No Limit" (Radio Edit No Rap) (3:08)
"No Limit" (Extended No Rap) (5:44)
"No Limit" (Extended Rap) (5:55)
"No Limit" (Rio and Le Jean Version) (3:57)

7" single
"No Limit" (3:15)
"No Limit" (Rio and Le Jean Remix) (3:53)

UK 7" single
"No Limit" (3:15)
"No Limit" (Automatic Breakbeat Remix) (4:45)

12" maxi
"No Limit" (Extended) (5:44)
"No Limit" (Extended Rap) (5:55)
"No Limit" (Rio and Le Jean Remix) (4:56)

12" maxi Italy
"No Limit" (Extended No Rap 2) (5:55)
"No Limit" (Extended Rap) (5:55)
"No Limit" (Rio and Le Jean Remix) (4:56)
"No Limit" (Automatic Remix) (4:54)
"No Limit" (Automatic Breakbeat Remix) (4:45)
"No Limit" (Radio Rap Edit) (3:30)

Charts

Weekly charts

Year-end charts

Decade-end charts

Certifications and sales

Millennium remixes

CD single
"No Limit" (Moon Project Edit) (3:50)
"No Limit" (Starfighter Remix Edit) (3:15)

CD maxi
"No Limit" (Starfighter Remix Edit) (3:15)
"No Limit" (Starfighter Remix) (7:55)
"No Limit" (Push's Transcendental Rmx) (8:26)
"No Limit" (Moon Project Remix) (7:43)
"No Limit" (Razzor and Guido Remix Dub) (10:38)

12" single
"No Limit" (Starfighter Remix) (7:55)
"No Limit" (Razor and Guido Dub) (10:38)
"No Limit" (Push's Transcendental Remix) (8:26)
"No Limit" (Moon Project Remix) (7:43)

No Limit 2.3

"No Limit 2.3" peaked number 41 in the German Top 100 Singles chart.

CD single
"No Limit 2.3" (Master Blaster Radio Edit) (3:12)
"No Limit 2.3" (Master Blaster Remix) (5:25)
"No Limit 2.3" (DJ Digress Hamburg Style Remix) (7:23)
"No Limit 2.3" (DJ Sputnik Remix) (6:54)
"No Limit 2.3" (Original Extended Mix) (5:42)

12" single
"No Limit 2.3" (Master Blaster Remix) (5:25)
"No Limit 2.3" (Marco De Jonge Club Mix) (5:38)
"No Limit 2.3" (DJ Digress Hamburg Style Remix) (7:25)
"No Limit 2.3" (Original Extended Mix) (5:40)

Irene Moors and de Smurfen cover
A Dutch cover version by Irene Moors en de Smurfen topped the Dutch charts for six weeks in 1995.

Standard CD single
"No Limit"– 3:05
"Ga Je Met Ons Mee (Naar Smurfenland)"– 2:53

CD maxi-single
"No Limit" (radio edit)– 3:05
"No Limit" (Smurf the House mix)– 4:46
"No Limit" (karaoke)– 3:05
"Die Dal Dee"– 3:28

beFour cover

"No Limit" was covered by German band beFour on their fourth studio album Friends 4 Ever, and as a single in Germany, Austria and Switzerland. The song entered the German Singles Chart in 2009.

Track listings
CD maxi
"No Limit" (Single version) (3:25)
"No Limit" (Remix) (3:41)
"All Around The Planet" (3:53)
"No Limit" (Video) (3:25)

Digital download
"No Limit" (Single version) (3:25)
"No Limit" (Remix) (3:41)
"All Around the Planet" (3:53)

Charts

See also

List of number-one hits of 1993 (Austria)
List of Dutch Top 40 number-one singles of 1993
List of European number-one hits of 1993
List of number-one singles of 1993 (France)
List of number-one singles of 1993 (Ireland)
List of number-one songs in Norway
List of number-one singles of 1993 (Spain)
List of number-one singles and albums in Sweden
List of number-one singles of the 1990s (Switzerland)
List of UK Singles Chart number ones of the 1990s

References

1993 songs
1993 singles
2009 singles
2 Unlimited songs
BeFour songs
Hermes House Band songs
Dutch Top 40 number-one singles
European Hot 100 Singles number-one singles
Irish Singles Chart number-one singles
Number-one singles in Austria
Number-one singles in Finland
SNEP Top Singles number-one singles
Number-one singles in Italy
Number-one singles in Denmark
Number-one singles in Norway
Number-one singles in Portugal
Number-one singles in Spain
Number-one singles in Sweden
Number-one singles in Switzerland
Byte Records singles
ZYX Music singles
Pete Waterman Entertainment singles
Songs written by Anita Doth
Songs written by Jean-Paul De Coster
Songs written by Phil Wilde
Songs written by Ray Slijngaard
Ultratop 50 Singles (Flanders) number-one singles
UK Singles Chart number-one singles
Music videos directed by Nick Burgess-Jones